The Corinthian Project is a BBC Books adventure book written by Davey Moore and is based on the long-running British science fiction television series Doctor Who.
It features the Tenth Doctor and Martha.

This is part of the Decide Your Destiny series which makes you choose what happens in the books.

Plot
When the TARDIS lands in an undersea community known as the Corinthian Project, it doesn't take you long to realise there are some very strange things going on. Explore the project and see if you can uncover the truth...

Reception
The book has received some negative reviews, which also highlight the disappointment of the initial selection of books on the whole. Nonetheless, they were successful enough to allow the range to continue.

References

2007 science fiction novels
Decide Your Destiny gamebooks
Tenth Doctor novels